Cecil McBee (born May 19, 1935) is an American jazz bassist. He has recorded as a leader only a handful of times since the 1970s, but has contributed as a sideman to a number of jazz albums.

Biography

Early life and career
McBee was born in Tulsa, Oklahoma, United States. He studied clarinet at school, but switched to bass at the age of 17, and began playing in local nightclubs. After gaining a music degree from Ohio Central State University, McBee spent two years in the U.S. Army, during which time he conducted the band at Fort Knox. In 1959, he played with Dinah Washington, and in 1962 he moved to Detroit, Michigan, where he worked with Paul Winter's folk-rock ensemble between  1963 and 1964.

New York
His jazz career began to take off in the mid-1960s, after he moved to New York, when he began playing and recording with a number of significant musicians including Miles Davis, Andrew Hill, Sam Rivers, Jackie McLean (1964), Wayne Shorter (1965–66), Charles Lloyd (1966), Yusef Lateef (1967–69), Keith Jarrett, Freddie Hubbard and Woody Shaw (1986), and Alice Coltrane (1969–72).

Later career
In the 2000s, McBee unsuccessfully sued a Japanese company that opened a chain of stores under his name.

He was an artist in residence at Harvard from 2010 to 2011. He teaches at the New England Conservatory in Boston, Massachusetts.

Awards
1991 he was inducted into the Oklahoma Jazz Hall of Fame.

Grammys
Blues for Coltrane: A Tribute to John Coltrane (MCA, 1987), Pharoah Sanders/David Murray/McCoy Tyner/Cecil McBee/Roy Haynes – Winner, Best instrumental performance, individual or group, Grammy Awards, 1988.

Discography

As leader/co-leader 
 1975: Mutima (Strata-East)
 1977: Almanac (Improvising Artists) with Almanac: Mike Nock, Bennie Maupin, Eddie Marshall – recorded in 1967
 1977: Music from the Source (Enja)
 1977: Compassion (Enja)
 1979: Alternate Spaces (India Navigation)
 1982: Flying Out (India Navigation)
 1986: Roots of Blue (RPR) – duets with Muhal Richard Abrams
 1997: Unspoken (Palmetto)

As sideman
With George Adams
America (Blue Note, 1990)
With Ray Anderson
Old Bottles - New Wine (Enja, 1985)
With Chet Baker
 Blues for a Reason (Criss Cross Jazz, 1985)
With Bill Barron 
Live at Cobi's 2 (SteepleChase, 1985 [2006])
With Kenny Barron
Landscape (Baystate, 1984)
 What If? (Enja, 1986)
Live at Fat Tuesdays (Enja, 1988)
With the Bob Thiele Collective
 Sunrise Sunset (Red Baron, 1990)
With Joanne Brackeen
 Snooze (Choice, 1975)
Tring-a-Ling (Choice, 1977)
Havin' Fun (Concord Jazz, 1985) 
Fi-Fi Goes to Heaven (Concord Jazz, 1986)
Turnaround (Evidence, 1992)
With Dollar Brand
 African Space Program (Enja, 1973)
With Anthony Braxton
 Eight (+3) Tristano Compositions, 1989: For Warne Marsh (hatArt, 1989)
With Roy Brooks
 The Free Slave (Muse, 1970 [1972])
With Joe Chambers
 The Almoravid (Muse, 1974)
With Alice Coltrane
 Journey in Satchidananda (Impulse!, 1970)
 Carnegie Hall '71 (Hi Hat, 2018)
With Junior Cook
Pressure Cooker (Catalyst, 1977)
With Stanley Cowell
 Equipoise (Galaxy, 1979)
 Close to You Alone (DIW, 1990)
With Ted Curson
 Blue Piccolo (Whynot, 1976)
With Ricky Ford
Looking Ahead (Muse. 1986)
With Chico Freeman
 Morning Prayer (India Navigation, 1976)
 Chico (India Navigation, 1977)
 The Outside Within (India Navigation, 1978)
 Kings of Mali (India Navigation, 1978)
 Spirit Sensitive (India Navigation, 1979)
 Destiny's Dance (Contemporary, 1981)
With Hal Galper
Now Hear This (Enja, 1977)
With Johnny Griffin
 Birds and Ballads (1978)
With Louis Hayes
Variety Is the Spice (Gryphon, 1978)
With Roy Haynes
Thank You Thank You (Galaxy, 1977)
Vistalite (Galaxy, 1977 [1979])
With Andrew Hill
 Compulsion! (Blue Note, 1965)
With Freddie Hubbard and Woody Shaw
 Double Take (Blue Note, 1986)
With Elvin Jones
 Power Trio (Novus, 1990) – with John Hicks
 When I Was at Aso-Mountain (Enja, 1990)
 Elvin Jones Jazz Machine (Trio, 1997)
 It Don't Mean a Thing (Enja, 1993)
With Clifford Jordan
 Two Tenor Winner (Criss Cross, 1984)
With John Klemmer
 Magic and Movement (Impulse!, 1974)
With Prince Lasha
 Inside Story (Enja, 1965 [1981])
With Yusef Lateef
 The Complete Yusef Lateef (Atlantic, 1967)
 The Blue Yusef Lateef (Atlantic, 1968)
 Yusef Lateef's Detroit (Atlantic, 1969)
 The Diverse Yusef Lateef (Atlantic, 1970)
With The Leaders
 Mudfoot (Black Hawk, 1986)
 Out Here Like This (Black Saint, 1987)
 Heaven Dance (Sunnyside, 1988) – The Leaders Trio with pianist Kirk Lightsey and drummer Don Moye
 Unforeseen Blessings (Black Saint, 1988)
 Slipping and Sliding (Sound Hills, 1994)
 Spirits Alike (Double Moon, 2006)
With Dave Liebman
 The Seasons (Soul Note, 1992)
 John Coltrane's Meditations (Arkadia Jazz, 1998)
With Charles Lloyd
 Dream Weaver (1966, Atlantic)
 Forest Flower (1966, Atlantic)
 The Flowering (1966, Atlantic)
 Charles Lloyd in Europe (1966, Atlantic)
With Raphe Malik
 Storyline (Boxholder, 1999) – with Cody Moffett
With Joe Maneri
 Dahabenzapple (hat ART, 1993 [1996])
With Jackie McLean
 It's Time! (Blue Note, 1964)
 Action Action Action (Blue Note, 1964)
With Lloyd McNeill
 Treasures (1976)
With Charles McPherson
 New Horizons (Xanadu, 1977)
With Grachan Moncur III
 Some Other Stuff (Blue Note, 1964)
With Tisziji Munoz
 Rendezvous With Now (India Navigation, 1978)
 Visiting This Planet (Anami Music, 1988)
 Presence of Joy (Anami Music, 1999)
 Divine Radiance (Anami Music, 2003)
With Amina Claudine Myers
 Salutes Bessie Smith (Leo, 1980)
With Art Pepper
 Winter Moon (Galaxy, 1980)
With Dannie Richmond
 "In" Jazz for the Culture Set (Impulse!, 1965)
With Sam Rivers
 Dimensions & Extensions (Blue Note, 1967)
 Streams (Impulse!, 1973)
 Hues (Impulse!, 1973)
With Charlie Rouse
 Social Call (Uptown, 1984) with Red Rodney
With Pharoah Sanders
 Izipho Zam (My Gifts) (Strata-East, 1969 [1973])
 Jewels of Thought (Impulse!, 1969)
 Thembi (Impulse!, 1970)
 Black Unity (Impulse!, 1971)
 Live at the East (Impulse!, 1972)
 Village of the Pharoahs (Impulse!, 1973)
 Love in Us All (Impulse!, 1973)
 Wisdom Through Music (Impulse!, 1973)
With various artists
 The New Wave in Jazz (Impulse!, 1965)
With Saxophone Summit
 Gathering of Spirits (Telarch, 2004)
With Zbigniew Seifert
 Man of the Light (MPS Records, 1977)
With Woody Shaw
 The Moontrane (Muse, 1974)
 Love Dance (Muse, 1975)
 The Iron Men with Anthony Braxton (Muse, 1977 [1980])
With Archie Shepp
 Lady Bird (Denon, 1978)
With Wayne Shorter
 Et Cetera (Blue Note, 1965)
 Odyssey of Iska (Blue Note, 1970)
With Sonny Simmons
 Burning Spirits (Contemporary, 1971)
With Lonnie Liston Smith
Astral Traveling (Flying Dutchman, 1973)
 Expansions (Flying Dutchman, 1975)
 Rejuvenation (Doctor Jazz, 1985)
Make Someone Happy (Doctor Jazz, 1986)
With Buddy Tate and Dollar Brand
Buddy Tate Meets Dollar Brand (Chiaroscuro, 1977)
With Leon Thomas
 Spirits Known and Unknown (1969)
With Horace Tapscott
 The Dark Tree, Vol. 1 & 2 (hatOLOGY, 1989)
With Charles Tolliver
 Live at Slugs', Volume I & II (Strata-East, 1970)
 Music Inc. (Strata-East, 1971)
 Impact (Strata-East, 1975)
With Mickey Tucker
 Sojourn (Xanadu, 1977)
 Mister Mysterious (Muse, 1978)
With McCoy Tyner
 Quartets 4 X 4 (Milestone, 1980)
 Blues for Coltrane (1987)
With James "Blood" Ulmer
 Revealing (1977)
With Mal Waldron
 What It Is (Enja, 1981)
With Michael White
 The Land of Spirit and Light (Impulse!, 1973)
With Paul Winter
 Jazz Meets the Folk-Song (1963)
With Yōsuke Yamashita
 Sakura (Verve, 1990)
 Kurdish Dance (Verve, 1993)
 Dazzling Days (Verve, 1993)
 Fragments 1999 (Verve, 1999)
 Spider (Verve, 1996)
 Delightful Contrast (Universal, 2011)
With Denny Zeitlin
 Cathexis (Columbia, 1963)
With Norman Connors
 Dance of Magic (Sony Music Entertainment, 1972)

References

External links
 [ Allmusic biography]
Cecil McBee Interview NAMM Oral History Library (2020)
 

1935 births
Living people
Musicians from Tulsa, Oklahoma
Post-bop jazz musicians
American jazz double-bassists
Male double-bassists
Grammy Award winners
New England Conservatory faculty
Strata-East Records artists
India Navigation artists
Enja Records artists
Inner City Records artists
Palmetto Records artists
Jazz musicians from Oklahoma
21st-century double-bassists
21st-century American male musicians
American male jazz musicians
Almanac (band) members
The Leaders members
Improvising Artists Records artists
NoBusiness Records artists